Hannele Tonna (née Valkonen, born January 3, 1978) is a Finnish ski-orienteering competitor and World Champion. She won a gold medal in the sprint at the 2009 World Ski Orienteering Championships. She won silver medals in the long distance in 2004, and again in 2007.

She is married to Eivind Tonna.

See also
 Finnish orienteers
 List of orienteers
 List of orienteering events

References

Finnish orienteers
Female orienteers
Ski-orienteers
1978 births
Living people